Icaronycteris is an extinct genus of microchiropteran (echolocating) bat that lived in the early Eocene, approximately , making it the earliest known definitive bat. Four exceptionally preserved specimens, among the best preserved bat fossils, are known from the Green River Formation of North America. There is only one thoroughly described species of bat in the genus, I. index, although fragmentary material from France has also been tentatively placed within Icaronycteris as the second species I. menui.
I. sigei is based on well-preserved fragments of dentaries and lower teeth found in Western India.

Description

It closely resembled modern bats, but had some primitive traits. The tail was much longer and not connected to the hind legs with a skin membrane, the first wing finger bore a claw and the body was more flexible. Similarly, it had a full set of relatively unspecialised teeth, similar to those of a modern shrew. Its anatomy suggests that, like modern bats, Icaronycteris slept while hanging upside down, holding onto a tree branch or stone ridge with its hind legs.

Phylogeny

See also

 Onychonycteris
 Australonycteris

References

Notes

Sources

Further reading

 
 
 
 

Prehistoric bat genera
Eocene bats
Fossil taxa described in 1966
Eocene mammals of North America